The Road Development Authority (commonly abbreviated as RDA); is the premier highway authority in Sri Lanka and is responsible for the maintenance and development of the National Highway Network, comprising the trunk (A class) and main roads and the planning, design and construction of new highways, bridges and expressways to augment the existing network in the country.

The RDA plans the future road network while conducting feasibility studies before major projects and post-evaluations after completion to ensure adequate economic returns.

See also 
 Highway museum complex, Kiribathkumbura

External links
Road Development Authority
Expressway Operation Maintenance and Management Division

1971 establishments in Ceylon
Government agencies established in 1971
Road authorities
Transport organisations based in Sri Lanka